Valvil Ori was a  king and a skilled archer, who ruled Kolli Hills region in present day Tamil Nadu. He was one of the Tamil Kadai ezhu vallal (Transl. 'Last Seven Patrons'). Politically he aligned with the Cholas and fought against the Cheras and Malaiyaman Thirumudi Kari. Legend claims that he was defeated and killed by Kari of the beautiful spear, the lord of Mullur, who then gave Kolli hills to the Cheras. Kari was later killed by the Chola king Killivalavan.

References

History of Tamil Nadu
2nd-century Indian monarchs
3rd-century Indian monarchs
3rd-century Indian people
Kadai ezhu vallal